Piptatherum holciforme is a species of perennial cereal grass known by the common names rice grass, hairy ricegrass, and hairy millet grass, endemic to Eurasia, especially the Mediterranean basin. The seed of the plant is a type of grain millet that can be ground into meal and prepared as a porridge.

Description
Piptatherum holciforme stands erect about 50-80 cm., having dissected leaves branched from its base, growing in clusters of several propagation runners. The stems are sessile, slightly tilting forward because of the weight of the inflorescence, each made up of 3-4 internodes.

The grains are borne upon a panicle, consisting of spikelets with a short caducous awn; each grain being ovoid in shape, pointed at one end and having a shiny black appearance. Each seedling bears micro-hairs. The seed and the lower chaff that encloses the seed of the Piptatherum holciforme are the largest and longest of all species of Piptatherum that grow in Israel and they reach a length of 1–1.5 cm., without the awn (spikelets).

The plant's modern taxonomic name was described in 1817 by the Swiss botanist and entomologist Johann Jacob Roemer (1763-1819) and his colleague, the Austrian botanist, Josef August Schultes (1773-1831). The plant was first described several years earlier, in 1808, by the German botanist Friedrich August Freiherr Marschall von Bieberstein (1768-1826) as belonging to the genus Agrostis holciformis.

In classical Hebrew literature the plant falls under the generic classification of "millet", one of the cereal grasses, and is probably the naqlivas mentioned in the Babylonian Talmud (Avodah Zarah) as once being used by idolaters.

Habitat and distribution
Piptatherum holciforme grows in waste habitats, along waysides, and adapts well in moist, stony chalkstone soils in Mediterranean scrubland. Its global distribution extends across Europe, North Africa and the Middle East.

Cultivation
Today, the hairy millet grass has a wide distribution, growing almost exclusively in the wild. To what extent the cereal grass was cultivated in the past by indigenous peoples is now unclear, owing to the multiple varieties of millet and panic. Ohalo, a paleolithic hunter-gatherer archaeological site in Galilee, along the shore of the Sea of Galilee, revealed a storage facility where the grains of hairy millet grass, along with other grains, had been stored. In Israel, seedlings of hairy millet grass are sometimes used to reseed marginal land for pasture.

References

Further reading
 Freitag, Helmut (1975). "The genus Piptatherum (Gramineae) in Southwest Asia." Notes Royal Botanic Garden Edinburgh, volume 33: pp. 341–408

External links
 Wild Flowers of Israel. Piptatherum holciforme
 JSTOR Global Plants: Piptatherum holciforme
 Phylogenetics of Piptatherum s.l. (Poaceae: Stipeae): Evidence for a new genus, Piptatheropsis, and resurrection of Patis (TAXON, 2011 

Plants described in 1817
Pooideae
Grasses of Asia
Flora of Israel
Flora of Lebanon
Flora of Greece
Flora of Turkey
Cereals
Forages